US-China strategic engagement refers to a wide range of specific practices and interaction including economic cooperation, public diplomacy, military and foreign aid between the United States and China. This phase of engagement can be traced back to the late 1960s following an intense period of hostility caused by indirect confrontation between the two countries, particularly during the Korean War and the Vietnam War. With the US' support for Taiwan during the Taiwan Strait crises and its military expansion in the Pacific region, the relationship grew more antagonistic for the Chinese government perceive these initiatives to be US' attempt to encircle China. The domestic upheaval as a result of the Cultural Revolution in China and its commitment to communism through political radicalism accelerated the conflict. The four presidencies preceding the Bush administration were said to embrace a national policy direction toward strategic ambiguity, or deliberate ambiguity particularly in dealing with China. In October 2018, Vice President Mike Pence delivered a speech at the Hudson Institute on China, signifying the end of strategic engagement and officially proclaiming a new stage in the bilateral relationship, strategic competition.

Background 
In 1949, the establishment of the People's Republic of China (PRC) in the mainland after successfully revolting against the Nationalist government further severed its relationship with the US, who feared the balance of power would be threatened by the expansion of a powerful Soviet-led communist bloc. As PRC's paramount leader and Chairman of the Chinese Communist Party, in 1950 Mao Zedong paid an official visit to the Soviet Union, where the two communist states entered into agreement the Sino-Soviet Alliance Treaty. The Treaty formalized Kremlin's major commitment to secure the Asian theater from falling under the US' influence by its pledge to supply military equipment and provide financial loans to support China. Although Mao and Kim didn't share many strategic views at the time, with Soviet support China sided with North Korea and contributed its so-called "Chinese volunteers" to fight the war against South Korea, who was backed and defended mainly by the US.

The US' support for the nationalist government across the strait was an important cause in perpetuating the irreconcilable distrust between the two countries. By recognizing the Chiang-led ROC as the legitimate government for the whole China, the US proclaimed its support to strengthening the security cooperation with Taipei by the singing of a mutual defense treaty in 1954. With President John F. Kennedy promising to protect Taiwan during the Taiwan Strait crises of 1955 and 1958 and his insistence on the "Two Chinas policy", any hope for rapprochement at this time was overshadowed by the Chinese immense perception of threat on its quest to reunification.

Further worsening this hostility was the entry into force of a series of defense treaties between the US with Australia, New Zealand, and Japan (ANZUS) and the establishment of SEATO in 1954 as an alliance structure of regional security, which China believed to not only hedge against Soviet influence but also to contain Chinese development. US military engagement in the Pacific led to the forward deployment of its military troops around the region, such stationing activities greatly reinforced the idea of "containment" on the China side.

With the outbreak of the Vietnam War in 1955, US gradually became more involved in the region by directly sending troops to Vietnam to make sure it would not fall under communist control. This ideology-driven calculation was substantiated by the "domino theory", leading to a proxy war fought between North Vietnam who wanted self-determination and a US-backed South Vietnam. Because Vietnam is located in such a geographically strategic area bordering China, the Vietnam War posed an imminent threat to its security. Along with the Soviet Union, China remained a major ally of North Vietnam by providing military training, human power and essential supplies to Viet Cong (the National Liberation Front). The escalation of conflict in Vietnam coincided with China's quickly degrading relationship with the Soviet Union and an increasingly chaotic domestic situation caused by the Cultural Revolution, all of which amplified the threat perception it had against the two biggest powers at this time.

Cold War Change of Atmosphere

Detenté 
By the 1960s, the US had started to notice the tension in Sino-Soviet relation, and it sought to take advantage of this crack to contain the Soviet Union. With the Nixon administration attempting to facilitate a settlement to its quagmire in Vietnam, one of the symbolic acts signifying the beginning of Detenté, this paved the way for successful rapprochement. In 1972, Nixon visited China where he gave a landmark speech, also known as the Shanghai Communiqué, on the importance of diplomatic normalization to both countries' interests. The Communiqué assured China that the US would now recognize only the mainland government as the legitimate authority of both states across the Taiwan Strait, and that the US won't challenge against One China Policy, a doctrine asserted by the PRC.

In 1978 President Carter and the PRC agreed to the complete normalization of diplomatic relation, officially ending decades of hostility and confrontation between the two countries. With a change in the leadership of the Chinese Communist Party (CCP) from Hua Guofeng to Deng Xiaoping in 1978, China implemented a drastic number of market reforms and subsequently became more open to foreign businesses and investment. Referred to in the Carter administration as a political move of "playing the China card" to keep the Soviet Union in check, US' reversal of foreign policy direction regarding the Taiwan issue brought US diplomatic tie with the ROC to an end. However, with the entry into force of the Taiwan Relations Act of 1979, the US continued its substantial but unofficial support to Taiwan to maintain security and strategic peace. The continuation of US arms sales to Taiwan was charged by the PRC as a breach from what their joint Communiqué issued in 1982 has stated, that the US "intends to gradually reduce its sale of arms to Taiwan".

Arm sales to China by the US 
The Reagan administration reinforced US commitment to strengthen diplomatic relation with China by the passage of the Third Joint Communiqué in August 1982. With more public pressure to hedge against Soviet expansion, US government eventually allowed government-to-government military purchases to be made by the PRC under the authorization of Congress and the Foreign Military Sales Program. The two countries also embarked on cooperation in the field of nuclear energy, evident in the 1985 Agreement on Nuclear Cooperation, in which the US pledged to provide a legal framework to assist China in its peaceful nuclear development agenda with high technology transferred from US companies. By 1986, the military sale had surpassed US$37 million, approximately $20 million of which were commercial sales. US and China military relationship became more pronounced when US Secretary of Defense Caspar Weinberger described it in September 1983 as possessing "three pillars" of coordination including senior visits, exchanges and technological cooperation.

By this stage there was less discussion on strategic engagement between China and the US. This was partly due to the increasing amount of positive diplomatic progress in Soviet-US relation being facilitated under the leadership of the General Secretary of the Soviet Union, Gorbachev.

Tiananmen Square 
Human rights has long been a contentious issue with which the US has to come to terms regarding China. Under the pressure from Congress and the international society which condemned the massacre at Tiananmen Square, President Bush temporarily slowed down cooperation between two states while trying to maintain the substance of their diplomatic ties. US government suspended military exports and arms sales to China, imposed sanctions including cancellations of high-level visits by US senior officials to the mainland. China accused any external effort to intervene into its domestic affairs as an outright infringement on its national sovereignty, including the US'.

Despite the level of international outrage pointed at the crackdown, maintaining ties with China remained important to US national interests. This was shown in the dispatch of National Security Adviser Brent Scowcroft and Deputy Secretary of State Lawrence Eagleburger on a secret task to mend the relationship through diplomatic channels in July 1989, only several weeks after the brutal killings.

Post Cold-War Strategic Issues

G. H. W. Bush administration

Gulf Conflict 
A major issue at the beginning of the decade was the occupation of Iraq in Kuwait. Although China agreed to the US-sponsored resolution in the UN Security Council demanding Iraqi withdrawal from Kuwait, it was hesitant about agreeing to the use of force under the UNSC auspices to stop the annexation. China chose to abstain when a resolution on this matter was called to a vote on 20 November 1990 (Resolution 678). When a US-led coalition of 35 countries waged a war against Iraq in January - February 1991, this was an opportunity for China to witness the military and technological superiority of the US. China's military modernization was heavily shaped by this experience.

Kosovo Crisis 
The issue raised for China at the time of the Gulf Conflict in 1990-1991 arose again in the Kosovo crisis. In 1998–1999, Slobodan Milosevic started an atrocious nationwide project of ethnic cleansing against the majority Kosovo Albanians and the insurgents who wanted to oppose the continuous suppression carried out in the country. China saw US initiative of moving forces into the region to stop Serbian aggression as an attempt to consolidate its hegemonic influence. But China was also concerned about how this move can possibly set a precedent that might be invoked later as a justification for the international community to interfere into matters of strategic importance to China such as Taiwan and Tibet. With those assessments in mind, along with Russia portraying the situation in Kosovo as being exclusively under the Yugoslavian government's national authority, the proposed UNSC resolution to use military force was vetoed. Unable to gain legitimacy for its conduct under UN authorization, the US turned to NATO to seek public support for intervention in Kosovo. The bombing campaign under NATO auspices, which began on 24 March 1999, commenced airstrikes against Serbian military targets in Yugoslavia. A specific crisis in Sino-US relations during this campaign arose after the accidental bombing of the Chinese embassy in Belgrade on 7 May 1999 by US warplanes.

Clinton administration

China's accession to WTO 
China's accession to WTO was preceded by a series of lengthy negotiations and discussion on significant required adjustments in the Chinese economy, which was an imperative for membership to be admitted. After Congress granted China the most favored nation status in 1980, the level of traded goods and products between two countries intensified, signaling a new period of economic interdependence when the US went on to become China's third largest-trading partner in 1984. Nevertheless, public pressure from anti-Chinese lobby groups and activists during multiple US Congressional hearings made obtaining China's MFN status renewal increasingly difficult.

In September 1999, Clinton and Chinese leader Jiang Zemin agreed to resume negotiations on China WTO membership when progress was halted after the US accidentally bombed a Chinese embassy in Belgrade. With President Clinton's persuasive rhetoric on the US ability to gain leverage over not only a market-open, reform-committed but also potentially democratizable China whose economic dependence will allow greater room for the US to exercise influence, Congress passed legislation to grant China permanent trading privileges and historically put the two countries on equal footing as the latter became an official member of the WTO.

During this period, the US purposely maintained a neutral attitude of "strategic ambiguity", not seeking to provoke China by promising to defend Taiwan but sending clear signals to express its interest in Taiwan's security.

G. W. Bush administration

Departure from strategic ambiguity 
Tension developed in this period for the assertive approach taken by China and an explicitly aggressive attitude adopted by the Bush administration in dealing with sensitive issues. The antagonism was heightened again when President Bush declared that the US would do "whatever it takes" to defend Taiwan, much to the resentment of China. However, the US also had to take care that Taiwan did not exploit this situation and precipitate a crisis to move toward asserting independence. Despite official attempts from the State Department to reconfirm that there had been no change in the US position, the general impression remained that there had been a somewhat departure from the policy of "strategic ambiguity".

War on terrorism 
The relationship between the two powers was affected in various ways against the background of the September 11 attacks. With Bush's declaration of the war on terrorism, China indicated its fervent support. Despite the shock induced from this series of brutal terrorist attacks orchestrated by al-Qaeda, at the same time China saw this situation as providing opportunities for improving relations with the US. In the Middle East, China joined the US-led anti-terrorism campaign in Afghanistan against the Taliban, and tactically gained US trust as a regional intermediary in pressuring Pakistan for cooperation. In Asia, China put aside its historical resentment toward Japan's potential marine expansion in the region and agreed to Japanese vessels' operation in the Indian Ocean to support the war against Afghanistan. By giving its full support to US in the war against terrorism, China hoped to win US support in its campaign against Muslim separatists in Xinjiang who were now labelled "terrorists". The US was reluctant to support China's suppression efforts over separatist movements in Xinjiang, and the differences over Tibet and Taiwan seemed irreconcilable.

North Korean issue 
In Northeast Asia developments relating to North Korea highlighted the importance of Sino-US cooperation. The Republican administration was critical of the 1994 Geneva Accord for giving too much energy and financial assistance to North Korea without there being any guarantee that it would not renege on its commitment. This led to North Korea reactivating one of its nuclear proliferation programs, and subsequently withdrawing from the Treaty on the Non-Proliferation of Nuclear Weapons. US and China worked closely to constrain North Korea's nuclear capability, which was shown in their joint effort to formalize the Six Party Talks in 2003. While US needed China to apply pressure on Pyongyang, China remained skeptical of the degree of pragmatic actualization of a comprehensive and verifiable denuclearization goal set out by the former state.

Obama administration 
President Obama visited China during his first year in office, making him the first US president to ever do so. Obama reshaped the direction of American foreign policy with his proclamation of "Pivot to Asia", and so engagement with China on all strategic fields of importance still remains a priority throughout his two terms. Generally focusing on peaceful cooperation with a clearly constrained reliance on military rhetoric, the relationship between two countries witnessed mostly positive development in Obama's first term, but gradually became characterized by more complex layers of dynamics and accompanied global-level threats during the final years of Obama's administration.

Obama was a fervent supporter of facilitating dialogues and keeping negotiations alive when it comes to China. His participation in international intergovernmental economic organizations demonstrated a relentless attempt to integrate China into the already existing border-transcending institutional frameworks such as the G7 and G20, a practice held by his administration to work in favor of both the world and America.

The two countries collaborated to impose sanctions on North Korea for its continued proliferation activities of nuclear weapons through the binding power given by the UNSC. Both states vowed to take an initiative in the fight against global warming and climate change by the signing of the Paris accords, which China has said it would protect even when Donald Trump decided to withdraw the US from the agreement. The Paris climate deal pledges to cut global greenhouse gas emission and transform the world into a low-carbon consuming business with big industrialized states like the US and China committing to modify national legislation to meet the preset objectives. During his first Asia trip in 2017 since leaving office, Obama was complimented by General Secretary of the Chinese Communist Party Xi Jinping for his devoted contributions in bettering Sino-US relation albeit the still on-going territorial disputes in the South China Sea and the high level of tension caused by a huge trade deficit in their trade relationship.

Trump administration 
US China relationship has been characterized by a high level of friction within the first few years of the Trump administration. The massive over-time accumulation of US trade deficit against China has resulted in the media labeling their trade interaction the "trade war". Because China imports raw materials and petroleum from the community of developing countries in the Middle East and exports manufactured goods to the US, it has an asymmetrically large surplus with the latter. Leaders of the two countries have worsened the issue by imposing tariffs in a tit-for-tat chain of reactions which whipsaw American businesses with production facilities outsourced in China for cheap labor and easy access to the market.

Much of the unsettled conflicts dealt with by previous administrations still account for a large part in the two countries' relationship. These problems have become much more complicated and encompass many different aspects including freedom of navigation in the South China Sea, tension over autonomous regions, global threats like climate change, cyber warfare, international terrorism, and possible covert interference into US elections, all of which require an efficient exercise of diplomacy and cooperation.

The Trump administration has vastly changed the method by which the US has often used to pressure China on making economic concessions, which is the exercise of powerplay derived from multilateralism. The US pulled out its signature from the TPP, a regional trade pact in Asia Pacific committed to protect intellectual property rights, maintain labor standards, reinforce environmental regulations and reduce trade barriers between member states. Without a US-led economic arm that could help contain China's geopolitical influence, US withdrawal was perceived by many to further enhance China's domination in the region.

On October 4, 2018, Vice President Pence stated to the press that a new approach in dealing with China's excesses would be taken, officially ending the era of strategic engagement and transitioning into strategic competition.

References 

Chinese foreign policy